Williams Gap, at an elevation of , is a gap in Banner County, Nebraska.

Williams Gap was named for George Williams, a pioneer who settled there.

References

Landforms of Banner County, Nebraska
Mountain passes of Nebraska